Diplacus vandenbergensis, commonly known as the Vandenberg monkeyflower, is a species of Diplacus located in the Phrymaceae family. It grows as a small herbaceous annual plant and is native to the Burton Mesa Ecological Reserve in Santa Barbara County, California. According to the U.S. Fish and Wildlife Service it is an endangered species and hence was allocated critical habitat within the reserve in 2014.

Description

This annual plant grows roughly to a height of  before it releases seeds and dies. The yellow flowers emerge between May and June, with the pedicel being 1–4 mm long and the calyx 5–14 mm. The tube/throat of the flower is 9–23 mm long. The fruit is 6.5–13 mm long.

Habitat
The primary habitats of this species are chaparral, cismontane woodlands and coastal dunes. It grows in sandy soil between larger shrubs where it receives increased protection from external threats such as wind and animals. Influx of these small areas by invasive plant species such as Pampas grass, Veldt grass and Iceplant pose the greatest risk to this species. It is also threatened by development and off-road vehicles.

References

External links
Federal Register - Designation of Critical Habitat for Diplacus vandenbergensis
Jepson Herbarium - Detailed plant profile

vandenbergensis
Flora of the California desert regions
Endangered flora of the United States
Flora without expected TNC conservation status